Towarri is a national park located in New South Wales, Australia,  north of Sydney.

Towarri is a diverse landscape with a variety of plant vegetation, it is also a habitat for many birds among others and the endangered speckled warbler.

The average elevation of the terrain is 502 meters.

References

See also
 Protected areas of New South Wales

National parks of the Hunter Region
Upper Hunter Shire
Protected areas established in 1998
1998 establishments in Australia